The women's hammer throw event at the 1995 Pan American Games was held at the Estadio Atletico "Justo Roman" on 17 March. It was the first time that the hammer was contested by women at the Games and one of the earliest international competitions for this event.

Results

References

Athletics at the 1995 Pan American Games
1995